Naushad Irshad (born 15 December 1993) is a Pakistani first-class cricketer who played for Quetta cricket team.

References

External links
 

1993 births
Living people
Pakistani cricketers
Quetta cricketers
People from Kech District